Pozible is an Australia-based crowdfunding platform and community-building tool for creative projects and ideas. It was developed to help people raise funds.

Model 
Pozible is a crowdfunding platform and creative community. Projects are launched on the Pozible website after a reviewing process to make sure the project abides by the platform's project guidelines. Project creators select a deadline and a target amount to achieve. Supporters are invited and encouraged to pledge an amount to support the project's campaign. During the project's campaign, project creators are encouraged to publicise their works through embedded videos, word of mouth, social networks and regular project updates.

If the nominated target is not met by the deadline, pledges are not processed. Supporters require a MasterCard or Visa credit card or debit card to make a pledge. In May 2012, Pozible introduced PayPal as a payment method.   In October 2013,  Pozible introduced Bitcoin as a payment method.  This allows projects from around the world to raise funds in their country's currency.

Pozible takes a 5% service fee from successful projects, and a transfer is made into the project creator's bank account or PayPal account. Partners and previously successful project creators are only required to pay a 4% fee for their successful projects.  In April 2014, Pozible reduced fees for projects that raise over $100,000 to 4% and over $500,000 to 3%.   In turn, project creators must provide rewards (non-financial at present) to their supporters, relative to how much is pledged, though pledgers are not obliged to select a reward, they can still pledge funds with no reward chosen.

Creators can choose from the following Models:
 Standard project
 Subscription crowdfunding:  Gives users the ability to offer subscription based rewards like magazines.
 Self-Hosted crowdfunding:  For users that don't want to divert traffic from their own websites and have good web design skills.

Unsuccessful projects are not required to pay a fee.

History 
Pozible was launched as Fundbreak in May 2010 by Alan Crabbe and Rick Chen.
Pozible's good reputation among arts practitioners and connections in the local Australian arts industry has seen collaborations with festivals and government partners such as ScreenWest, the Emerging Writers Festival and the Melbourne and Sydney Fringe Festivals and many local non-for-profit organisations.

The Fundbreak brand was relaunched as Pozible in January 2011, and established offices in Melbourne and Sydney, Australia.
In May 2012, Pozible launched internationally - switching to www.pozible.com from www.pozible.com.au - and partnered with PayPal to offer multi-currency transactions. Pozible now accepts projects and funding support in 22 major currencies.

In 2013, Pozible achieved a number of milestones: it raised AUD $1 million+ in a single month for the first time; this was repeated in September 2013 and in subsequent months.

As at 31 December 2013, Pozible went live in Malaysia and Singapore.

As at April 2016, Pozible has hosted over 10,000 projects and raised a total of over $40 million towards projects from Australia and around the world. Pozible continues to operate from its headquarters in Melbourne, Australia and has opened offices in Silicon Valley (USA), China and Singapore.

Pozible was listed as one of three start-ups to watch in 2014 by The Australian Financial Review, one of 'five start ups to watch in 2014' by Startup Smart and Smart Company and was featured on the cover of TechCrunch.

Pozible's overall success rate is 58%, with individual categories averaging up to 70%.

In 2017, Birchal was founded as a sister platform to Pozible, offering equity crowdfunding.

See also

 Comparison of crowdfunding services
 VentureCrowd

References

External links
 

Social economy in Australia
Crowdfunding platforms
Companies based in Melbourne
Financial services companies established in 2010
Australian companies established in 2010
Privately held companies of Australia
Online financial services companies of Australia
Investment companies of Australia
2010 establishments in Australia